Historical simulation may refer to:
 Historical simulation (finance), time series analysis
 Historical dynamics, realistic computer simulations of history
 Living history, historical re-creations, acting out history

See also 
 Simulation (disambiguation)